Stuart MacBride is a Scottish writer, most famous for his crime thrillers set in the "Granite City" of Aberdeen and featuring Detective Sergeant Logan McRae.

Biography
Stuart MacBride was born 27 February 1969 in Dumbarton, Scotland and raised in Aberdeen. His careers include scrubbing toilets offshore, graphic design, web design and IT/computer programming. He studied architecture at Heriot-Watt University.

MacBride's publishing deal was secured with the writing of Halfhead; however, the publishers were more interested in Cold Granite, concerning DS Logan McRae. He was signed on a three-book Logan deal, which was further extended to six books. In 2009 he signed another deal, allowing him to write two more Logan books, and two standalone novels, the first of which is due after the sixth instalment of the Logan McRae series. In an interview for the Alibi television channel, MacBride indicated he considered R. D. Wingfield a "literary inspiration". MacBride's novels, particularly those featuring Logan McRae, have been described as Tartan Noir, which has placed him alongside Ian Rankin and Val McDermid as authors who have also been described as luminaries of the genre.

He now lives in north-east Scotland with his wife, Fiona and their cat Grendel.

Outside of his writing, Macbride is noted for being one of the initial ten batch of people in the Aberdeen Hall of Heroes and being crowned World Stovies Champion in 2014. He also won Celebrity Mastermind in 2017 with a specialist subject on the life and works of A. A. Milne.

Bibliography

Logan McRae novels
 2005 - Cold Granite
 2006 - Dying Light
 2007 - Broken Skin (published in America as Bloodshot)
 2008 - Flesh House
 2009 - Blind Eye
 2010 - Dark Blood
 2011 - Shatter the Bones
 2012 - Partners in Crime (Two Logan and Steel short stories: Bad Heir Day and Stramash) (eBook)
 2013 - Close to the Bone
 2014 - The 45% Hangover (A Logan and Steel novella)
 2015 - 22 Dead Little Bodies (A Logan and Steel short novel)
 2015 - The Missing and the Dead
 2016 - In the Cold Dark Ground
 2017 - Now We Are Dead
 2018 - The Blood Road
 2019 - All That's Dead

Oldcastle novels
 2012 - Birthdays for the Dead
 2014 - A Song for the Dying
 2017 - A Dark so Deadly
 2021 - The Coffinmaker’s Garden
 2022 - No Less the Devil

Other works
 2008 - Sawbones
 2009 - Halfhead
 2011 - Twelve Days of Winter (E-Book; released in print in 2012)

Awards
Won, Barry Award for Best First Novel, 2006 (for Cold Granite)
Won, CWA Dagger in the Library Award, 2007
Won, ITV3 Crime Thriller Award for Breakthrough Author of the Year, 2008 (for Broken Skin)
Nominated, International Thriller Writers Awards, Best Debut Novel, 2006 (for Cold Granite)
Nominated, Theakston's Old Peculier Crime Novel of the Year Award, 2006 (for Cold Granite)
Nominated, Theakston's Old Peculier Crime Novel of the Year Award, 2007 (for Dying Light)
Nominated, Barry Award for Best British Crime Novel, 2007 (for Dying Light)
Nominated, Theakston's Old Peculier Crime Novel of the Year Award, 2009 (for Broken Skin)

See also
List of Logan McRae characters

References

External links
 

Living people
Scottish novelists
Scottish crime fiction writers
Scottish science fiction writers
People associated with Aberdeen
People from Aberdeen
People from Dumbarton
Barry Award winners
1969 births
Tartan Noir writers